Robert A. Benton Jr. (born June 28, 1979) is an American former professional stock car racing driver who competed in the NASCAR Busch, Truck and East Series as well as the ARCA Re/Max Series. He currently works as the team manager for Team Penske's NASCAR teams. Before starting in that position in January 2018, he was the owner of NASCAR team RAB Racing and Change Racing, a team in the IMSA sports car series.

Racing career

Team owner career
Benton's first dip into team ownership came in the early part of his career, when he fielded cars for himself when he competed in a No. 82 Ford in the ARCA Re/Max Series in 2000.

Benton then partnered with owner-driver Brack Maggard's ARCA team in 2007 to form RAB Racing with Brack Maggard. Benton became the majority owner, and the name change to RAB stood for Benton's initials. The team continued to field Maggard's No. 65 Dodge with Justin Marks, who joined the team late in 2006, continuing as the driver.

RAB Racing would begin in NASCAR in 2008, fielding a Nationwide (now Xfinity) Series team with John Wes Townley driving the No. 09 Ford with Zaxby's sponsorship, which Townley brought to the team. They would leave after 2009, with the team starting the 2010 season without a sponsor. Scott Riggs was supposed to drive the car full-time, but was quickly replaced by any driver who brought sponsorship in order to keep the team afloat. The team was likely to shut down at some point that year or at the end of the year, but the team pulled off an upset win in the Montreal race with road course ringer Boris Said in an exciting photo finish with Max Papis, which saved the team from closing.

Motorsports career results

NASCAR
(key) (Bold – Pole position awarded by qualifying time. Italics – Pole position earned by points standings or practice time. * – Most laps led.)

Busch Series

Craftsman Truck Series

Busch North Series

ARCA Re/Max Series
(key) (Bold – Pole position awarded by qualifying time. Italics – Pole position earned by points standings or practice time. * – Most laps led.)

References

External links
 

1979 births
Living people
People from Harrisburg, North Carolina
Racing drivers from Charlotte, North Carolina
Racing drivers from North Carolina
NASCAR drivers
ARCA Menards Series drivers